Leo Spitz (1888, Chicago–April 16, 1956) was an American film executive, best known for running International Pictures with William Goetz. When International merged with Universal Studios to form Universal-International in 1946, Spitz and Goetz ran the studio together. From 1950 to 1956 he owned a home in Palm Springs, California. He was interred at Forest Lawn Memorial Park in Glendale, California.

References

1888 births
1956 deaths
American film studio executives
Businesspeople from Palm Springs, California
Burials at Forest Lawn Memorial Park (Glendale)
Place of death missing
20th-century American businesspeople